"Your Old Cold Shoulder" is a song written by Richard Leigh that was originally performed by American country music artist Crystal Gayle. It was released as a promotional single in 1979 via United Artists Records.

Background and reception 
"Your Old Cold Shoulder" was originally record on October 13, 1976 at Jack's Tracks, a studio located in Nashville, Tennessee. Other tracks recorded at the session were the hits "When I Dream" and "Ready for the Times to Get Better". The session was produced by Allen Reynolds.

"Your Old Cold Shoulder" was officially released in July 1979 and peaked at number five on the Billboard Hot Country Singles chart on February 8, 1980. "Your Old Cold Shoulder" also peaked in the five position on the Canadian RPM Country Songs chart.

Weekly charts

References 

1979 songs
1979 singles
Crystal Gayle songs
Song recordings produced by Allen Reynolds
Songs written by Richard Leigh (songwriter)
United Artists Records singles